State Route 175 (SR 175) is a Tennessee designated state route, running for a total of approximately  through southern Shelby County, Tennessee.

History
These last 2.4 miles of SR 175 (Collierville Road) have undergone rigorous construction since about 1998, and barely one-third of the current road follows exactly the original route.

Prior to the 1980s, Shelby Drive was known as "Whitehaven-Capleville Road" or "Whitecap" for short; also, the portion of the current route between Fleming Road and Byhalia Road in Collierville was called "Mann Road."

Route description

Memphis

SR 175 begins in extreme southwestern Shelby County as a continuation of MS 301 along Weaver Road. It intersects US 61/SR 14 (Third Street) and travels with it until Shelby Drive where it turns east. SR 175 then crosses the Illinois Central Railroad. From this point, SR 175 travels another 2.4 miles through Whitehaven in southern Memphis, and intercepts US 51 (SR 3/Elvis Presley Boulevard). Shortly after, intercepting Airways Boulevard and passing the Memphis International Airport. After passing the airport SR 175 has an intersection with SR 176 (Getwell Road) before it intercepts US 78 (SR 4/Lamar Avenue) within the community of Capleville and crosses the BNSF Railway twice.

Germantown

After , and crossing several major city roads, SR 175 (East Shelby Drive) crosses South Germantown Road and enters Germantown. It then intercepts Hacks Cross Road after .

Collierville

Following another 2 miles, SR 175 (East Shelby Drive) shares a crossroads with Forest Hill Irene Road, entering Collierville, and becoming a two-lane road. For the next 2 miles SR 175 is somewhat rural, then crossing South Houston Levee Road. SR 175 then briefly widens to six lanes for  before crossing Fleming Road, and then goes another  along a narrow rural route before stopping at Byhalia Road. SR 175 turns left onto Byhalia Road and heads nearly due north. SR 175 continues for 1 mile until widening to four lanes and crossing SR 385. SR 175 then travels 1 mile before the designation ends at Poplar Avenue (US 72/SR 57) in the heart of the Collierville business district. Although SR 175 stops here, Byhalia Road continues.

Major intersections

See also

References

175
Transportation in Memphis, Tennessee
Transportation in Shelby County, Tennessee
Collierville, Tennessee